Artemisiopsis is a genus of flowering plants in the daisy family, Asteraceae.

It contains only one known species, Artemisiopsis villosa, native to eastern and southern Africa (Kenya, Tanzania, Angola, Malawi, Zambia, Zimbabwe, Botswana, Namibia)

References

Athroismeae
Monotypic Asteraceae genera
Flora of Africa